Charles Lockwood may refer to:

 Charles Lockwood (author) (1948–2012)
 Charles Andrews Lockwood (1890–1967), United States Navy admiral
 Charles A. Lockwood (politician), Oregon politician in 35th Oregon Legislative Assembly
 Charles Barrett Lockwood (1856–1914), British surgeon and anatomist
 Charles Clapp Lockwood (1877–1958), New York politician and judge